Philip H. Goodman (November 26, 1915 – May 1, 1976) was an American politician, 43rd Mayor of the City of Baltimore and a member of the Maryland Senate. He was Jewish of Polish descent and is buried at Har Sinai Cemetery in Owings Mills.

Goodman was born in the shtetl of Kołki, then part of the Volhynian Governorate of the Russian Empire (now Kolky in the Volyn Oblast of Ukraine). His family moved to the United States when he was six.

Education

Goodman grew up in Baltimore and attended the Baltimore City College high school. He earned his law degree from the University of Baltimore School of Law.

See also
 List of mayors of the largest 50 US cities

References

1915 births
1976 deaths
American people of Polish-Jewish descent
American people of Ukrainian-Jewish descent
Baltimore City Council members
Burials at Har Sinai Cemetery
Polish emigrants to the United States
Jewish mayors of places in the United States
Maryland Democrats
Mayors of Baltimore
People from Volhynian Governorate
People of Galician-Jewish descent
University of Baltimore School of Law alumni
20th-century American politicians
Jewish American people in Maryland politics
20th-century American Jews